The 1909 Minnesota Golden Gophers football team represented the University of Minnesota in the 1909 college football season. In their tenth year under head coach Henry L. Williams, the Golden Gophers compiled a 6–1 record (3–0 against Western Conference opponents), won the conference championship, and outscored their opponents by a combined total of 158 to 27.

Schedule

References

Minnesota
Minnesota Golden Gophers football seasons
Big Ten Conference football champion seasons
Minnesota Golden Gophers football